Within Temptation is a Dutch Edison Award-winning symphonic metal band from Netherlands formed in 1996 by vocalist Sharon den Adel and guitarist Robert Westerholt.

The band's first release, Enter, came in 1997 and made the band a prominent act in the Dutch underground scene, allowing them to play in metal festivals such as Dynamo Open Air. At the end of 2000 the band released their second album, entitled Mother Earth. The album did not reach commercial success until 2001 with the release of the album second single, "Ice Queen", which reached No. 2 on the Dutch charts. The album lead the band to both public and critic recognition earning them platinum status in the Netherlands and also two TMF Awards for "Best Rock" and "Most Promising Act". Since then, the band won the Conamus Exportprijs four years in a row. Their next albums The Silent Force and The Heart of Everything debuted at No. 1 on the Dutch charts, as the 2014 release Hydra, while also providing the band nominations in several national and international alwards such as the Edison Awards, Echo Awards, Revolver Golden Gods and MTV European Music Awards.

Awards

3FM Awards
The 3FM Awards are arranged by NPO 3FM and are decided by public vote. Within Temptation has won three awards from six nominations.

AIM Awards
The AIM Independent Music Awards are hosted by the Association of Independent Music (AIM) and were established in 2011 to recognize artists signed to independent record labels in the United Kingdom. Within Temptation has received one nomination.

Buma Cultuur Awards
The Buma Cultuur is a non-profit organization that supports and promotes Dutch music. Within Temptation has received the best-selling award on five years and the Buma Music in Motion, in which award new forms of delivering music, one.

 A Previously known as Conamus Export Award.

Echo Awards
The ECHO Music Awards were organized in 1992 by German Phonoakademie, the cultural institute of the German Music Industry Association (BVMI) to recognize national and international successful works, and winners are determined by representatives of record companies, music publishers, artists, critics and other professionals within the German music industry. Within Temptation received one nomination.

Edison Awards
The Edison Awards are an annual Dutch music prize awarded by NVPI, being the Dutch equivalent of the Grammy Awards. Within Temptation has won two awards out of three nominations.

Independent Music Companies Association Awards
The Independent Music Companies Association Awards (or IMPALA Awards) recognizes the best European independent musical releases of the year. The winners are defined by a jury based on artistic merit alone. Within Temptation has received one nomination.

Loudwire Music Awards
The Loudwire Music Awards are annually held by the online magazine Loudwire, in which covers hard rock and heavy metal music. The nominated works are selected by the editors and the winners by public vote. Within Temptation has won two awards and lead vocalist Sharon den Adel as well.

Metal Hammer Awards (GER)
The Metal Hammer Awards is an annual awards ceremony held by the German issue of Metal Hammer, a British heavy metal magazine. Within Temptation has won one award from two nominations.

Metal Hammer Golden Gods (UK)
The Metal Hammer Golden Gods Awards is an annual awards ceremony held by Metal Hammer, a British heavy metal magazine. Within Temptation has received two nominations.

MTV Europe Music Awards
The MTV Europe Music Awards were established in 1994 by MTV Networks Europe to celebrate the most popular music videos in Europe. Within Temptation has won one time from two nominations.

Netherlands Film Festival
The Netherlands Film Festival is an annual film festival held in the Dutch city of Utrecht. Within Temptation has received five nominations for their short films released alongside The Unforgiving.

The Rocks Awards
The Rocks is an annual awards ceremony held by Planet Rock, a British rock music radio station. The nominees are selected by the radio station and the winner by public vote Within Temptation has been nominated once.

Revolver Golden Gods
The Revolver Golden Gods Awards are an annual awards ceremony held by Revolver, an American hard rock and heavy metal magazine. Within Temptation has won one time.

TMF Awards
The TMF Awards were arranged by now inoperative international television channel The Music Factory and had both Belgian and Dutch ceremonies. Within Temptation received two awards from the Belgian ceremonies and four awards from the Dutch.

World Music Awards
The World Music Awards is an annual international awards show founded in 1989 that honours recording artists based on worldwide sales figures provided by the International Federation of the Phonographic Industry (IFPI). Within Temptation has received two times the best-selling award and has three nominations in the classificatory categories.

References

External links
Within Temptation Official Website

Albums
Lists of awards received by Dutch musician
Lists of awards received by musical group